KIGO (1420 AM) is a radio station broadcasting a regional Mexican format. Licensed to St. Anthony, Idaho, United States, the station is currently owned by Albino Ortega.

When it first came on the air in 1966 KIGO was on 1400 kHz. It moved to 1420 kHz in 2006.

References

External links

IGO
Radio stations established in 1999
1999 establishments in Idaho